The Highflyer-class cruisers were a group of three second-class protected cruisers built for the Royal Navy in the late 1890s.

Design and description

The Highflyer-class cruisers were essentially repeats of the previous , albeit with a more powerful armament and propulsion machinery. They were designed to displace . Their crew consisted of 470 officers and other ranks.

The ships were powered by two 4-cylinder triple-expansion steam engines, each driving one shaft, using steam provided by 18 Belleville boilers, which were lighter and more powerful than the cylindrical boilers used by the Eclipses. The ships easily exceeded their designed power and speeds during their sea trials.

The main armament of the Highflyer class consisted of 11 quick-firing (QF)  Mk I guns. One gun was mounted on the forecastle and two others were positioned on the quarterdeck. The remaining eight guns were placed port and starboard amidships. Eight QF 12-pounder 12 cwt guns were fitted for defence against torpedo boats. One additional 12-pounder 8 cwt gun could be dismounted for service ashore. They also carried six 3-pounder Hotchkiss guns and two submerged 18-inch (450 mm) torpedo tubes.

The main guns were fitted with 3-inch gun shields and the conning tower had armour 6 inches thick.

Ships
HMS Highflyer - launched on 4 June 1898, she served on numerous stations and hunted commerce raiders.  She was sold for scrapping 10 June 1921, by then the last Victorian era cruiser in service with the Royal Navy.
HMS Hermes - launched on 7 April 1898, she was converted to a seaplane carrier in 1913, and sunk on 31 October 1914 by U 27
HMS Hyacinth - launched on 27 October 1898, she served on southern stations in the First World War, and assisted in the blockade of SMS Königsberg.  She was sold for scrapping on 11 October 1923.

Notes

Footnotes

Bibliography

External links

Highflyer class in World War I
History of the Highflyer class
Highflyers
Experimental seaplane carrier Hermes

 
Cruiser classes
Ship classes of the Royal Navy